The Athletics Nauru (AN), also known as Nauru Athletics Association (NAA), is the governing body for the sport of athletics in Nauru.

History 
AN was founded in 1967 as Nauru Amateur Athletic Association (NAAA) and was affiliated to the IAAF in 1968.  

Current president is Hansome Adumur elected in January 2013.

Affiliations 
AN is the national member federation for Nauru in the following international organisations:
International Association of Athletics Federations (IAAF)
Oceania Athletic Association (OAA)
Moreover, it is part of the following national organisations:
Nauru Olympic Committee (NNOC)

National records 
AN maintains the Nauruan records in athletics.

References 

Nauru
Sports governing bodies in Nauru
Athletics in Nauru
National governing bodies for athletics
Sports organizations established in 1967
1967 establishments in Nauru